Bossa nova, nova bossa is the first album recorded by the Brazilian pianist and composer Manfredo Fest. Released on LP in 1963, this work counts on the musicians Humberto Clayber, Antonio Pinheiro and Hector Costita. It also counts on the participation of the vocal group Titulares do Ritmo on the last track. The group presents a fusion of bossa nova and jazz. In 2006, after period of neglect, this album was reissued on CD as one of the works included in Som Livre Masters series, organized by Charles Gavin.

Track listing

Personnel
Manfredo Fest  – piano, organ, saxophone
Humberto Clayber  – bass
Antonio Pinheiro  – drums
Hector Costita  – saxophone, flute
Titulares do Ritmo  – vocals

1963 albums
Manfredo Fest albums
Som Livre albums
Portuguese-language albums